Black Tape for a Blue Girl (often stylized as black tape for a blue girl) is an American dark wave band formed in 1986 by keyboardist/songwriter Sam Rosenthal, the founder of Projekt Records. 

Their music takes on elements of dark wave, ethereal, ambient, neoclassical, and dark cabaret music. Their 12th album, To touch the milky way, was released on October 26, 2018 on Projekt Records.

Biography

Formation/Oscar Herrera era (1986-1999)
Begun in California, Black Tape for a Blue Girl is based around Projekt Records founder Sam Rosenthal, the songwriter, lyricist and producer for the band. The band released seven albums in their first 13 years, covering the mid-80s through late-90s. Black Tape for a Blue Girl released their debut album The Rope in 1986. The band's line-up consisted of a core of Sam Rosenthal, Allan Kraut (on multiple instruments, including drums and guitars) and vocalist and guitarist Oscar Herrera. Guests included Kim Prior (as vocals), Adam Buhler (on guitar), Candy Sherlock and Lara Radford (as violinists).

Their second album, Mesmerized by the Sirens, was released a year later, followed by Ashes in the Brittle Air in 1989, A Chaos of Desire in 1991 and This Lush Garden Within in 1993. The core members through this period were Rosenthal and Oscar Herrera, with a variety of guests musicians based on friends Sam chose to work with. Julianna Towns, of the band Skinner Box, provided vocals, flute, and guitar on Chaos.

Recording of Remnants of a Deeper Purity began in 1995 in Los Angeles and was concluded in 1996 after Rosenthal's move to Chicago. This was the second album to feature Lucian Casselman on vocals and Vicki Richards on violin. It also featured Mera Roberts on cello.

In 1999, the band released As One Aflame Laid Bare by Desire, with Oscar Herrera singing two songs on the album as a parting favor to Rosenthal. The album owes some artistic inspiration to Marcel Duchamp. Towns returned for female vocals and also provided guitar arrangements. After a 15 city tour in July 1998 in preparation for the album's release, she was ejected from the band. Elysabeth Grant joined the band as violist, but Rosenthal quickly discovered her vocal talents. Grant was the singer for a 14 city tour of the album in February 1999, also featuring Lisa Feuer on flute and backing vocals.

Elysabeth Grant era (1999-2008)
In late 1999, Rosenthal (and now ex-wife Feuer) moved to New York City. Recording began on the band's seventh studio album, The Scavenger Bride, with Elysabeth Grant as lead vocalist and violist. Original vocalist Oscar Herrera was no longer involved with the band, giving up male vocal duties to Bret Helm (of Audra) and Athan Maroulis (of Spahn Ranch). The Scavenger Bride was released in 2002, with only two live appearances, as Rosenthal and Feuer's son was born.

Two years later, the band released Halo Star, which shifted the vocal focus to Bret Helm. This album also marked a change in the bands' lush, ethereal sound. It is the band's first journey into a dark cabaret musical style, very similar to the Dresden Dolls and Katzenjammer Kabarett. An 18 city West Coast and East Coast tour wan through September and October 2004, with the band lineup of Rosenthal, Helm, Grant, Bart Helm, Nicki Jaine and Jay.

Rosenthal and Jaine (vocals and guitar) spent 2005 recording and performing as Revue Noir.

Black Tape for a Blue Girl performed three shows in 2007 with the lineup of Rosenthal, Grant, Helm and Feuer.

Athan Maroulis era (2009-2012)
Athan Maroulis, who appeared on two songs on The Scavenger Bride album, as well as a cover of Dead Can Dance's "Fortune Presents Gifts Not According to the Book", took over as lead vocalist.

On September 22, 2009, the band released their 10th album, 10 Neurotics, with the lineup of Rosenthal on acoustic guitar, programming and keyboards, Brian Viglione (The Dresden Dolls) on drums, percussion, bass and guitar, and vocalists Maroulis (Spahn Ranch), Laurie Reade (ex-Attrition) and Nicki Jaine on additional vocals. Sam explained that the risque nature of the Neurotics-material caused the previous band members to shy away from singing the songs, though Grant did appear on the song "You Strike Me Down", previously released in a longer and more ethereal form on Projekt200.

In August 2009, the band was invited to play at a CD release party for Dreamchild's Sleeping Flowers Severed, Scream of Laughter. Wisteriax performed an opening cello piece, Black Tape for a Blue Girl performed a four-song set from 10 Neurotics, and Dreamchild finished with a final set. The band played East Coast shows and festivals with Rosenthal, Maroulis, Jaine and occasionally Viglione (on guitar).

In October 2010, Valerie Gentile (The Crüxshadows) joined Black Tape for a Blue Girl as guitarist and vocalist, replacing Jaine, who retired from music at this point.

In October 2011, Pinky Weitzman (Not Waving But Drowning) replaced vocalist Valerie Gentile, who was living in Los Angeles. Maroulis, Rosenthal and Weitzman performed three shows together, including the 2011 Projektfest.

With Maroulis as vocalist, Black Tape For A Blue Girl played 31 shows between August 2009 and November 2011. In mid-2011, Rosenthal and Maroulis, with guest cellist Erica Mulkey / Unwoman, recorded a cover of the 1983 David Sylvian / Ryuichi Sakamoto track "Forbidden Colours" which appeared on the Projekt Holiday release Ornamental.

The band then entered a mostly dormant phase while Rosenthal wrote (in 2012) and promoted his erotic novel, Rye.

Post-NYC era (2013-present)
In August 2013, Rosenthal moved to Portland, Oregon. His endorsement of crowd-funding grew after the successful 2013 Kickstarter for the vinyl reissue of Remnants of a Deeper Purity.

In January 2015, Rosenthal launched a Patreon page to support the recording of new music. In April 2015, the first result of this Patron support was As Lonely As Dave Bowman's Monolith CD, a solo-electronic release from Rosenthal.  In September 2015, a Kickstarter was created to fund a 12" single  with four new tracks, all sung by Michael Plaster of the Projekt Records act SoulWhirlingSomehwhere.

Rosenthal wrote, "The tracks on the EP are a bit of an anomaly from the others I am recording; these are sparse and sensitive acoustic guitar pieces with Michael's vocals." At this time, he announced the name and stylistic change of the spring 2016 Black Tape For A Blue Girl album, "These fleeting moments will be a return to the ethereal darkwave/dark ambient sound of the early 90s Blacktape CDs."

The band's 12th studio album, To Touch the Milky Way, was released in 2018.

Style
The style of Black Tape for a Blue Girl is often described as "gothic", though their large catalog of music does not often conform with general standards of gothic or darkwave music. The music could be described as a soundscape of analog synth and old world instruments (both real and synthesized) mixed with ethereal male and female vocals. The lyric writing is done by Rosenthal himself and often explores powerful emotions of love, vulnerability, isolation, loss, jealousy, and passion.

Notable past members
Past members include Elysabeth Grant (also of Rachael's Surrender) on vocals and violin, Bret Helm (of Audra) on vocals, acoustic guitar and bass, Lisa Feuer on flute and vocals and Michael Laird (of Unto Ashes) on acoustic guitar, percussion and vocals. A notable former member is the long-time vocalist Oscar Herrera (of the 1980s Florida-based The Sleep of Reason), who performed on the band's first seven albums and their 11th album, These Fleeting Moments.

Discography

Studio albums

Maxi-CDs and singles

References

External links
 
 
 Black Tape for a Blue girl interview (February 1998) for QRD
 Sam Rosenthal interviews on Outsight Radio Hours

American gothic rock groups
American dark wave musical groups
Projekt Records artists
Musical groups established in 1986
Ethereal wave musical groups